Piko Interactive LLC is an American video game publisher based in San Antonio, Texas. Founded in early 2013 by Eli Galindo, the company focuses on physical re-releases of games from older video game consoles and digitally released ports to newer systems.

History

On March 7, 2013, Piko Interactive launched their first crowdfunding campaign on Kickstarter to fund a physical release of Super 4 in 1 Multicart for the SNES, with a funding goal of $10,500. The cartridge consists of 4 different games from 3 different developers; each with their own style and taste. This campaign was successfully funded with $15,050 on 184 backers.

In July 16, 2016 Piko Interactive and Wisdom Tree launched a crowdfunding campaign  on Kickstarter to fund "Wisdom Tree Return with Arkade Plug and Play", with a funding goal of $16,500. It was successfully funded with $25,965 on 341 backers.

On August 4, 2017, Piko Interactive and Wisdom Tree launched another crowdfunding campaign on Kickstarter to fund a physical release of 3 different games (Noah's Ark for NES, Mega 3D Noah's Ark for Genesis, and Wisdom Tree Collection for GBA), with a funding goal of $15,000. It was successfully funded with $17,196 on 200 backers.

On January 2, 2018, Piko announced via their website that they had closed a catalog acquisition of 60 titles, now owning over 100 IPs. The acquisition considered of mostly original IPs from Atari SA. On February 12, 2018, Piko launched a crowdfunding campaign on Kickstarter to fund a physical release of the canceled Nintendo 64 port of 40 Winks, with a funding goal of $20,000. The game is the first for the system by Piko, and the first new title for the Nintendo 64 since its discontinuation. It was successfully funded with $131,252 on 1,709 backers.

On May 28, 2019, Piko launched another crowdfunding campaign on Kickstarter, this time to fund the production of an action figure line based on the game Switchblade, with a funding goal of $8,500. As part of the Kickstarter, they will launch a new brand called "Toyetico", which will focus on making toy lines for their products. This campaign was successfully funded with $9,525 on 170 backers. On August 9, 2019, 20 of their games were announced to be released on the Evercade console.

On January 15, 2020, Piko Interactive launched a crowdfunding campaign on Kickstarter to fund a physical release of Jim Power for a NES, SNES, Genesis, Turbografx and Amiga CD32, with a funding goal of $50,000. This campaign was successfully funded with $63,805 on 678 backers.

On January 4, 2021, Piko announced that they had acquired the Bleem! brand name, with plans to start a retrogaming-focused online storefront titled Bleem Powered. On March 02, 2021, Piko Interactive co-launched a crowdfunding campaign on Kickstarter with Comix.tv to fund a physical release of Stone Protectors, a Sega Genesis unreleased game and special edition animated series box set with 5 unreleased episodes. This campaign was successfully funded with $33,557 pledged of its $30,000 goal, on 371 backers.

On October 03, 2022, Piko Interactive co-launched another crowdfunding campaign on Kickstarter with Comix.tv to fund The Legend of Calamity Jane special DVD box set and special edition comic to celebrate the series’ 25th anniversary in 2022. This campaign was successfully funded with $24,284 pledged of its $15,000 goal, on 426 backers.

Games published

Physical releases

Digital releases 
Games released under a new label called "Classics Digital", which concentrates on publishing the games that they acquired in popular digital distribution channels like Steam Greenlight and GOG.com.

Games acquired
 Battle Squadron (Amiga, Genesis)
 Onslaught (Amiga, Atari ST, PC, Mega Drive)
 Sword of Sodan (Amiga, Genesis)
 Skweek (Amiga, Atari ST, Atari Lynx, PC, Amstrad CPC, Game Gear, PC Engine)
 Shui Hu Zhuan (Genesis)
 Tun Shi Dian Ti III (Genesis)
 Ya Se Chuan Shuo (Genesis)
 Fireteam Rogue (Super NES, Genesis)
 Mysterious Song (Super NES)
 Dragon Sword (N64)
 Glover (N64)
 Rage of the Dragons (Arcade, Neo Geo AES)

References

External links 

 
 Piko Interactive LLC at MobyGames
 Piko Interactive LLC at IGN.com

2013 establishments in Texas
Video game companies of the United States
Video game development companies
Video game publishers
Companies based in San Antonio
American companies established in 2013
Video game companies established in 2013